Thomas Stanhope Flournoy (December 15, 1811 – March 12, 1883) was a U.S. Representative from Virginia and a cavalry officer in the Confederate States Army during the American Civil War.

Biography
Born in Prince Edward County, Virginia, Flournoy was educated at Hampden-Sydney College. He engaged as a private teacher and subsequently studied law. He was admitted to the bar and commenced practice in Halifax, Virginia, in 1834.

Flournoy was elected as a Whig to the Thirtieth Congress (March 4, 1847 – March 3, 1849). He was an unsuccessful candidate for reelection in 1848 to the Thirty-first Congress and for election in 1850 to the Thirty-second Congress. He was an unsuccessful candidate of the American Party for Governor of Virginia in 1855, losing to Henry A. Wise.

He served as member of the secession convention in 1861 at Richmond. He then entered the Confederate States Army, raised a company of cavalry, and initially served as its captain. He was promoted to colonel of the 6th Virginia Cavalry. He participated in Stonewall Jackson's 1862 Valley Campaign and saw action at the battles of Port Republic and Cross Keys. He was again an unsuccessful candidate for governor in 1863.

After the war, Flournoy settled in Danville, Virginia, and again practiced law. He served as delegate to the 1876 Democratic National Convention.

He died at his home in Halifax County, Virginia, March 12, 1883, and was interred in the family plot on his estate.

Elections

1847; Flournoy was elected to the U.S. House of Representatives with 51.95% of the vote, defeating Democrat William Marshall Tredway.
1849 and 1851; Flournoy was unsuccessful in re-election bids in 1849 and 1851.

References

1811 births
1883 deaths
Virginia lawyers
Hampden–Sydney College alumni
People from Prince Edward County, Virginia
Confederate States Army officers
People of Virginia in the American Civil War
Politicians from Danville, Virginia
Virginia Secession Delegates of 1861
Whig Party members of the United States House of Representatives from Virginia
19th-century American politicians
19th-century American lawyers
People from Halifax, Virginia